Theodor Hermann Sternberg (5 January 1878 – 18 April 1950) was a German legal philosopher serving as a foreign advisor in Meiji period Japan, where he was an important contributor to the development of civil law in Japan.

Biography
Born in Berlin, Sternberg served as an instructor at Tokyo Imperial University from 1913 to 1918. He also lectured on occasion at Meiji University, and other major Japanese universities, speaking on civil law, criminal law and jurisprudence.

He died in Tokyo.

Literary works 
 Allgemeine Rechtslehre, 2 Vols. 1904
 Einführung in die Rechtswissenschaft, 1912
 Der Begriff der Philosophie, 1933

References
 Anna Bartels-Ishikawa: Theodor Sternberg: einer der Begründer des Freirechts in Deutschland und Japan. Duncker & Humblot, Berlin, 1998,  (German)

External links 
 Duncker & Humblot - Gesamtverzeichnis - Bartels-Ishikawa, Anna - Theodor Sternberg - at www.duncker-humblot.de (German)
 AISTUGIA Il "diritto libero" di Theodor Sternberg dalla Germania al Giappone del primo Novecento at venus.unive.it (Italian)
 SOCIOLOGIA DEL DIRITTO – Il diritto libero di Theodor Sternberg dalla Germania al Giappone at www.francoangeli.it (Italian)

1878 births
1950 deaths
German philosophers
Jurists from Berlin
Foreign advisors to the government in Meiji-period Japan
Foreign educators in Japan
German expatriates in Japan
Philosophers of law
German male writers
German people of Jewish descent
German Protestants